Dimitri Vladimirovich Isayev (6 June 1905 – 18 April 1930) was a Chuvash writer and literary critic. He was a prolific writer of short stories about the lives of young people in the years just after the Russian Revolution. He mainly wrote in the Chuvash language, and was keen to develop a proletarian Chuvash literature.

Life

Dimitri Vladimirovich Isayev was born on 6 June 1905 in Kovali, Urmarsky District in Chuvashia.
He came from a poor peasant family.
He completed basic school, then studied at the Communist University of the Toilers of the East in Moscow.
He was head of the Komsomol city committee of Cheboksary, the capital city of the Chuvash Republic and a port on the Volga River.
He taught social studies at the Central Chuvash Teachers College in Samara, further down the Volga.

Isayev became famous as an author.
His first lyric poem was "Юратрăм" (Loved), published by the magazine Songtao ("Anvil") in 1925.
Following this he produced many short stories, essays and travel notes.
This work included "Рабфак хĕрĕ" (Rabfakovka), "Отряд" (Detachment), "Çулăмри ял" (Village in flames), "Хура тинĕс хумĕ" (Wave of the Black Sea), "Лисук чăптаçă" (Rogozhnitsa Lizuk), "Люпук çырăвĕ" (Lyubuk Letter) and "Вăраннисем" (woken up).
His stories portray the turbulent lives of young people in the years just after the Russian Revolution of 1917. He describes their eagerness to develop a good life on the land, their love of the homeland and their work in transforming the villages and towns.

Isayev also wrote several articles of literary criticism.
He was in favor of developing a proletarian Chuvasian literature.
Isayev was one of the founders of the literary almanac for Chuvash Soviet writers of the Middle Volga Păr tapransan ("Things are moving"), later called Vătam Atăl ("Middle Volga").
He worked for the newspapers Canas ("Council") and Çamrăk hreschen ("Young Communist"), and the magazine Songtao ("Anvil").
In 1929–30 he worked on the Collective Farmer newspaper in Samara.
He died on 18 April 1930 in Samara.

Works

Isayev was the author of the books:
Proletarians literaturishĕn / For proletarian literature (1930)
Hĕrlĕ hunavsem / Red shoots,
Çĕnelnĕ yăh / New Generation (1930)
Pirěn ăru / Our generation (printed in 1947, 1981)
He was  the author of several articles of literary criticism, including:
Young writers and Komsomol
On poets and poetry
On the national culture
Learn from the Russian classics
Literary creativity Peoples of the USSR

Writings about Isayev

References

Sources

1905 births
1930 deaths
Chuvash-language poets
Chuvash writers
People from Urmarsky District
20th-century poets
Soviet writers
Soviet poets